The International Symposium on Wearable Computers or ISWC (pronounced "iz-wic") is one of the most prominent academic conferences on wearable computing and ubiquitous computing.

Its first edition was held in 1997 in Cambridge, MA, USA. Proceedings from every edition are published by IEEE Press.

Overview

References

External links
 Official website

Computer science conferences
Ubiquitous computing